This list of place names in Canada of Indigenous origin contains Canadian places whose names originate from the words of the First Nations, Métis, or Inuit, collectively referred to as Indigenous Peoples. When possible, the original word or phrase used by Indigenous Peoples is included, along with its generally believed meaning. Names listed are only those used in English or French, as many places have alternate names in the local native languages, e.g. Alkali Lake, British Columbia is Esket in the Shuswap language; Lytton, British Columbia is Camchin in the Thompson language (often used in English however, as Kumsheen).

Canada
The name Canada comes from the word meaning "village" or "settlement" in the Saint-Lawrence Iroquoian language spoken by the inhabitants of Stadacona and the neighbouring region near present-day Quebec City in the 16th century. Another contemporary meaning was "land." Jacques Cartier was first to use the word "Canada" to refer not only to the village of Stadacona, but also to the neighbouring region and to the Saint-Lawrence River.

In other Iroquoian languages, the words for "town" or "village" are similar: the Mohawk use kaná:ta''',Bright (2004:78) the Seneca iennekanandaa, and the Onondaga use ganataje.

Provinces and territories
Provinces and territories whose official names are aboriginal in origin are Yukon, Saskatchewan, Manitoba, Ontario, Quebec and Nunavut.

 Manitoba: Either derived from the Cree word manito-wapâw meaning "the strait of the spirit or manitobau" or the Assiniboine words mini and tobow meaning "Lake of the Prairie", referring to Lake Manitoba.
 Nunavut: "Our land" in Inuktitut.
 Ontario: Derived from the Huron word onitariio meaning "beautiful lake", or kanadario meaning "sparkling" or "beautiful" water.
 Quebec: from the Míkmaq word kepék, meaning "strait" or "narrows".
 Saskatchewan: Derived from the Cree name for the Saskatchewan River, kisiskāciwani-sīpiy, meaning "swift flowing river".
 Yukon: from an Athabaskan language, e.g. Koyukon yookkene or Lower Tanana yookuna.

By province and territory

Alberta
 Alexis Nakota Sioux Nation no. 437 (formerly "Indian Reserve") named after the Alexis family, prominent in the band 
 Amisk: "Beaver" in Cree.
Athabasca: "Where there are reeds" in Cree
Athabasca River
Athabasca Falls
Lake Athabasca
Mount Athabasca,
 Battle River translation of Cree place name. There were many fights in its area between Cree, Blackfoot and Nakoda.
 Bear Hills Lake translation of Cree place name.
 Bear Hill translation of Cree place name.
 Beaver Hills (includes today's Elk Island Park) translation of Cree, Blackfoot and Nakoda place names for the feature. Cree name for area was amiskwaciy, Cree name for Edmonton House was amiskwaciwâskahikan (Beaver Mountain House,
 Blood Reserve 148 (formerly Indian reserve) Kinai First Nation, name roughly translated as Blood in the past
 Bow River English translation of Blackfoot name for the river – Makhabn, "river where bow reeds grow" (Blackfoot), reeds there were good for making bows with which to shoot arrows.
 Bow Valley Natural Area (see Bow River)
 Calgary roads (trails) named after Indigenous Nations and an element of Metis lifestyle—Stoney, Blackfoot, Metis, Shaganappi, Sarcee, and Peigan Trails are all named in honour of the first people on this continent, although the latter two have since changed their names. The Peigan are now known as the Piikani Nation and the Sarcee are now the Tsuut’ina Nation, but both street names remain.
 Chipewyan: "duck lake" (includes Fort Chipewyan)
 Cooking Lake is a translation of its Cree place name , indicating a cooking place.
 Crowfoot Crossing—named after Crowfoot (Blackfoot name Sahpo Muxika) (born c. 1836; died April 24, 1890), chief of the Siksika First Nation and signatory of Treaty. He was instrumental during the Treaty 7 negotiations and acted as a representative of his people.
 Deerfoot Trail: after Deerfoot-Bad Meat, a Blackfoot man who was known around Calgary
 Edmonton wards (municipal election districts) all bear names of Indigenous origin, since 2020.
Nakoda Isga: Sioux, "the people," referring to the Alexis Nakota Sioux Nation. 
O-day’min: Anishinaabe, "strawberry," literally "heart berry," invoking the image of "the heart [of the city] through which the North Saskatchewan River runs."
Anirniq Pronunciation:  : Inuktun, "breath of life," honouring Inuit people who were brought to Edmonton in the 1950s and 1960s for treatment for tuberculosis, being separated from their families for long periods and often mistreated; many died and were buried in Edmonton. 
tastawiyiniwak Pronunciation:  : Cree, "the in-between people," referring to the two-spirit and LGBTQ+ communities
Dene Pronunciation:  : Dene language, "the people," referring to the Dene people
Métis Pronunciation:  : Michif, "Métis people," who farmed in this area 
sipiwiyiniwak Pronunciation:  : Enoch Cree, "river Cree," referring to the Enoch Cree people
papastew Pronunciation:  : Papaschase Cree, "woodpecker," the name of the Papaschase people, commemorating Chief Papaschase or Papastew (19th c.)
pihêsiwin   Pronunciation:  : Cree, "land of the thunderbirds"
Ipiihkoohkanipiaohtsi Pronunciation:  : Blackfoot, "northward migration of the bison"
Karhiio Pronunciation:  : Mohawk, "tall beautiful forest" (name of Michel Karhiio, chief of the Michel First Nation)
Sspomitapi Pronunciation:  : Blackfoot, "star person," a sacred iron meteorite, also known as the Iron Creek Meteorite or Manitou Stone (Manitou Asinîy), now in the Royal Alberta Museum
 Ermineskin Reserve 138 (formerly Indian reserve) owned by Ermineskin Cree Nation, one of the Four Nations of Maskwacis
 Goosequill Lake translation of Cree word  for the lake.
 Grand Forks: translation of Blackfoot name for the place
 Grand Prairie: translation of Cree name "Big Prairie"
 Ipiatik Lake.
 James Mowatt Trail. James Mowatt (Metis, born in St. Andrews, Manitoba) carried message from Edmonton to Calgary during 1885 Rebellion, asking for military assistance for Edmonton, which was thought to be under threat of Native uprising. He made the trip in only 36 hours, a record at that time. He later was a gold-rusher and then moved back to Manitoba.Edmonton Bulletin, May 6, 1897
 Kakisa River.
 Kakwa River.
 Kananaskis
Kapasiwin
Kapawe'no First Nation
Kaskitayo   Edmonton community. Originally spelled “Kaskiteeo,” this name is derived from the Cree word, noted by J. B. Tyrrell in the 1870s as kas-ki-tee-oo-asiki, meaning “blackmud creek.” S (Neighbourhood names in the Kaskitayo area honour Aboriginal leaders Bearspaw, Big Bear, Ermineskin, Kainai)
Kikino Trail, Edmonton. The name of this trail, a major walkway in the Thorncliff neighbourhood, reflects the theme of most of Edmonton’s walkways, which are named for prominent Aboriginal people or have a relationship with Aboriginal heritage. Kikino is said to be the Cree word for “our home.” Kikino Trail is one of a number of trail names approved between 1969 and 1971. This name has been in use since 1895. While its origin is not recorded, the name is taken from the Cree word , which means “a long lake.”
 Kimiwan: Cree word for rainy
 Kitaskino Nuwenëné Wildland Provincial Park (Wood Buffalo Park). Kitaskino Nuwenëné is both Cree and Dene meaning “our land.”
 Lake Minnewanka: "Water of the Spirits" in Sioux (Nakoda/Stoney language)
 Lily Lake—name is translation of Indigenous place name.
Makaoo. Cree name of early leader of the band, the Onion Lake Cree Nation in Alberta and Saskatchewan,.
 Manawan Lake: Cree for "egg-gathering place".
 Marie Lake: poor translation of the Cree word for the place , pronounced merai, which translates as a fish.
Maskêkosihk Trail (formerly 23 Avenue between 215 Street and Anthony Henday Drive) Road of the "people of the land of medicine" in Cree
 Maskepetoon Park (Red Deer) after Chief Maskepetoon (1807–1869). Said to be the "Gandhi of the Plains", he made temporary peace between the Cree and the Siksika before being killed by an enemy.
 Maskwa Creek near Wetaskiwin (Cree for 'black bear')
 Maskwacis (formerly known as Hobbema) collection of several First Nations name translates as 'bear hills'.
 Matchayaw Lake Cree for bad spirit. Palliser translated the name as Little Manitoo in 1865.
 Medicine Hat: Translation of the Blackfoot word , meaning "headdress of a medicine man".
Meeting Creek. English translation of the Cree name , which references the frequent meeting between the Cree and Blackfoot there.
Metiskow Cree for 'many trees'.
Mewassin Cree for 'good, beautiful'.
 Minaik: Cree (also Nakoda) "Minahik" for evergreen (pine or tamarack)
Michichi: Cree for 'hand' (nearby Hand Hills has same source).
Ministik (in the Beaver Hills UNESCO Biosphere Reserve) a former school district (Ministik School District #1796). Ministik Lake is nearby. Ministik means island in Nehiyawewin (Cree).
 Mitsue Creek.
 Mokowan Ridge.
 Moose Lake. Known to early French-Canadian fur traders as lac d'Orignal, meaning Moose Lake. This may have been a direct translation of the local Cree name of the same meaning, Mōswa sākahikan.
 Namaka (hamlet) Blackfoot name "near the water", referring to nearby Bow River or Eagle Lake.
 Neutral Hills Name commemorates the place where the Cree and Blackfoot made peace and chose to share the area's bison, ending decades-long fighting there.
 Nikanassin Range: "First range" in Cree
 Notikewin (hamlet) and Notikewin River. The name derives from nôtinikewin, the Cree word for "battle".Cree dictionary. "nôtinikewin". Retrieved March 17, 2010. 
 Okotoks: "Big Rock" in Blackfoot
Oldman River. The Piikani Nation of the Blackfoot Confederacy named the river after their traditional sacred ground at its headwaters, said to the "Old Man's Playing Ground," sacred ground of Napi, the Old Man, the Great Creator.
 Otoskwan school district and railway siding on outskirts of Edmonton, now within Edmonton. Named after Cree name for nearby water-course Blackmud Creek. Otoskwan translates as big tributary. (William Peter Baergen, Pioneering with A Piece of Chalk)
 Papaschase Industrial Park (Edmonton) named after Chief Papaschase (Papastayo) (ca. 1838–1918) or his band. (South Edmonton Saga)
 Peace River translation of Dane-zaa language river name , which is derived from peace made in late 1700s between two groups along its shores. 
 Peigan – former school district (#3430).
 Pekisko from Blackfoot place name pik-isko translates as "rough ridge" or "rolling hills".Hugh A. Dempsey, Indian Names for Alberta Communities, p. 16
 Piikani 147 Indian Reserve (on which Brocket is located) owned by Piikani Nation (formerly the Peigan Nation).
 Pipestone River translation of Cree and possibly Nakoda place name, derived from it being source of stone to make pipes.
 Ponoka: attempt to use its Blackfoot name ponokáwa "Elk" (Hugh A. Dempsey, Indian Names for Alberta Communities, p. 16; https://www.albertaparks.ca/parks/south/writing-on-stone-pp/education-interpretation/blackfoot-glossary/)
 Poundmaker Trail: named after Cree chief Poundmaker
 Prairie Creek: translation of Cree and Nakoda place name.
 Pretty Hill: translation of Cree place name.
 Princess Lake: translation of Cree place name.
 Rabbit Hill (Edmonton): translation of Cree place name.
 Red River: colour of water in river (red from its high iron content).
 Redearth Creek: soil on its shores used by Natives as body paint.
 Redearth Pass: soil in pass used by First Nations as body paint.
 Redwater (river and town): translation of Cree name "red water".
 Redwillow Creek: form of translation of Cree place name literally "red feathers/bristles small river".
 Sakaw (neighbourhood in southside Edmonton)
 Saskatchewan River, North and South Saskatchewan River. Derived from the Cree name for the Saskatchewan River, meaning "swift flowing river"
 Saskatoon Mountain Natural Area
 Seven Persons translation of Blackfoot name kitsikitapi-itsinitupi "seven persons were killed"  (Hugh A. Dempsey, Indian Names for Alberta Communities, p. 17) (see Hugh A. Dempsey, "A Blackfoot Winter Count" for full story.)
 Shaganappi Trail (Calgary). Shaganappi are rawhide strips. Used to repair a myriad of objects, it was the duct tape of its time.
 Skoki Mountain and Skoki valley. Stoney Nakoda word for swamp. There are several in the area.
 Skyrattler (neighbourhood in southside Edmonton)
 Slave Lake: "Slave" was a mis-translation of the Cree word for foreigner to describe the Athabaskan people living there. (see Slave River, NWT, below)
 Smoky Lake: This town's name comes from the Cree name for the almost-now-disappeared lake nearby. Wood Cree named it Smoking Lake for either the large number of campfires around it often, or smouldering coal-fires in the ground, or the unusually large quantities of mist that came off it at sunset.  (Hugh A. Dempsey, Indian Names for Alberta Communities, p. 17)
 Sounding Lake, in the Neutral Hills. Name is based on Native legend wherein a Great Eagle, Mikisew, emerges from the waters and takes off across the hills, its great wings making a noise like thunder.
 Spirit River translation of Cree name for nearby water-course chipi-sipi "spirit river"  (Hugh A. Dempsey, Indian Names for Alberta Communities, p. 17)
 Stony Plain translation of Cree name asinipwat-muskatayo "Stony (Native) plain"  (Hugh A. Dempsey, Indian Names for Alberta Communities, p. 18)
 Sucker Creek translation of Cree name nimipi-sipisis "sucker (fish) creek"  (Hugh A. Dempsey, Indian Names for Alberta Communities, p. 18)
 Tawatinaw (hamlet) near Highway 2 about 100 kms north of Edmonton
 Tecumseh, Mount a mountain in the Crowsnest Pass area
 Tipaskan (neighbourhood in southside Edmonton)
 Twin Butte  may be derived from Blackfoot name natsikapway-tomo "double hill"  (Hugh A. Dempsey, Indian Names for Alberta Communities, p. 18)
 Two Hills (town about 120 kilometres east of Edmonton) may be derived from Cree name misoyik-kispakinasik "two hills"  (Hugh A. Dempsey, Indian Names for Alberta Communities, p. 18)
 Valley of Ten Peaks includes these four peaks named after the numerals of the Stoney language:
 Mount Tonsa (no. 4)
 Mount Tuzo (no. 7)
 Neptuak Mountain (no. 9)
 Wenkchemna Peak (no. 10).
 Vermilion River (Alberta) translation of Cree name for the water-course, weeyaman-sipi "red paint river" (Hugh A. Dempsey, Indian Names for Alberta Communities, p. 18)
 Vermilion, Alberta see Vermilion River, which is nearby.
 Wabamun: (lake and town west of Edmonton) is a Cree word for "mirror" or "looking glass"
Wabamun 133A
Wabamun 133B
Wabamun Lake
Wabamun Lake Provincial Park
Wapiti River: from the Cree word for "elk",  (literally "white rump").
Waputik Range:  means "white goat" in Stoney
Waskatenau: village and creek. pronounced with silent "k." In 1880s area was home to the Wah-Sat-Now (Cree) band, which later moved to the Saddle Lake reserve. Cree term for "opening in the banks", in reference to the cleft in the nearby ridge through which the Waskatenau Creek flows.
Wetaskiwin: "Place of peace" or "hill of peace" in Cree
 Yoho Park. The Cree word "yoho" is used the same way as the English "wow."

British Columbia
For the scores of BC placenames from the Chinook Jargon, see List of Chinook Jargon place names.

A–B
 Ahnuhati River: "where the humpback salmon go" in Kwak'wala
 Ahousat: "people living with their backs to the mountains" in Nuu-chah-nulth (Nootka).
 Aiyansh and New Aiyansh: "early leaves" or "leafing early" in the Nisga'a language
 Akamina Pass: "mountain pass" in Ktunaxa (Kootenay)
 Akie River: "cut-bank river" in Dunne-za
 Amiskwi River: "beaver trail" in Cree
 Anyox: "place of hiding" in Nisga'a
 Ashlu Creek
 Ashnola River: thought to mean "white water" in Okanagan
 Asitka River, Asitka Peak, Asitka Lake
 Askom Mountain: "mountain" in St'at'imcets (the Lillooet language)
 Atchelitz: "bay" or "inlet" in Halqemeylem,
 Atlin: "big lake" in Inland Tlingit
 Atna Range: "strangers" or "other people" in Carrier.
 Atnarko River: "river of strangers" in Chilcotin
 Atsutla Range
 Attachie: the name of a Beaver indian whose descendants are members of the nearby Doig River First Nation
 Bella Coola: Named for the usual term for the local indigenous people, who call themselves Nuxalk.
 Bella Bella: This is an adaption of the Heiltsuk name for themselves, .
 Botanie Mountain, Botanie Creek, Botanie Valley etc., meaning "covered", "covering" or "blanketed all over" in Nlaka'pamux (Thompson), which is thought to be a reference to its shroud of cloud or fog in times of bad weather, or else a reference to the abundant plant cover in the area. An 1894 account of a Secwepemc (Shuswap) meaning is "many root place" (the upper end of the Botanie Valley is near the limit of Secwepemc territory)

C
 Canim Lake, Canim River, Canim Falls, Canim Beach Provincial Park: "canoe" in the Chinook Jargon
 Cariboo: from the Mi'kmaq language xalibu  or Qalipu via French caribou (1610) cariboeuf or carfboeuf: "pawer" or "scratcher". A mountain subspecies of caribou were once numerous.
 Carmanah Creek, Carmanah Valley, Carmanah Point: "thus far upstream" in the Nitinaht dialect of (Nuu-chah-nulth).
 Cassiar: a remote adaptation of Kaska, definition debatable, but possibly "old moccasins".
 Caycuse River: from the Nitinaht dialect of Nuu-chah-nulth language, meaning "place where they fix up canoes".
 Cayoosh Creek: Cayoosh is a Lillooet-area variant of cayuse, originally from the Spanish caballo – "horse", although in Lillooet and the Chilcotin this word specifies a particular breed of Indian mountain pony. There are two versions of the name's meaning. In one account, someone's pony dropped dead in or at the creek after an arduous journey over the pass at the head of its valley. In the other, the crest of standing waves in the rushing waters of the creek are said to resemble bucking horses and their manes.
 Celista, British Columbia: from the Secwepemc chiefly and family name Celesta, common in the nearby community of Neskonlith near Chase.
 Chaba Peak: from the Stoney language word for "beaver".
 Chantslar Lake: from the Chilcotin language word for "steelhead lake"
 Cheakamus River: from the Squamish language "Chiyakmesh", for "salmon weir place".
 Cheam: Halqemeylem for "(place to) always get strawberries". The Halqemeylem term refers to an island across from the present-day reserve and village. This name is used in English for Mount Cheam (Cheam Peak), the most prominent of the Four Sisters Range east of Chilliwack, which in Halqemeylem is called Thleethleq (the name of Mount Baker Kulshan's wife, turned to stone).
 Chechidla Range – from a phrase meaning "mountains of small rocks" in the Tahltan language
 Checleset Bay: from the Nuu-chah-nulth language name Cheklesahht, "people of cut on the beach", the local group of Nuu-chah-nulth people, whose band government today is the Kyuquot/Cheklesahht First Nation.
 Chedakuz Arm (Knewstubb Lake), Carrier language
 Cheewat River: from the Nitinaht dialect of Nuu-chah-nulth for "having an island nearby".
 Cheekye River and the locality of Cheekye near Squamish: from Nch'kay, the Squamish language name for Mount Garibaldi, meaning "dirty place" in reference to that mountain's ash-stained snows
 Chehalis and Chehalis River: probable meanings vary from "the place one reaches after ascending the rapids" or "where the 'chest' of a canoe grounds on a sandbar'. The sandbar or rapids in question would be the old "riffles" of the Harrison River where it empties into the Fraser River out of Harrison Bay (the riffles were dredged out in gold rush times). The Chehalis people refer to themselves, however, as Sts'ailes, "beating heart".
 Cheja Range – from a phrase meaning "mountains are hard" in the Tahltan language
 Chemainus: Named after the native shaman and prophet Tsa-meeun-is, which means "Broken Chest" or "bitten breast"(Hulquminum language), a reference to the bitemarks possible during a shamanic frenzy, which the local horseshoe-shaped bay is thought to have resembled.
 Cheslatta Lake: "top of small mountain" or "small rock mountain at east side" in the Carrier language
 Chezacut: "birds without feathers" in the Chilcotin language.
 Chic Chic Bay: Tshik-tshik, under various spellings, is the Chinook Jargon for a wagon or wheeled vehicle.
 Chikamin Range: Chickamin, as usually spelled, is "metal" or "ore" in the Chinook Jargon, often meaning simply "gold"
 Chilako River: "beaver hand river" in the Carrier language
 Chilanko River: "many beaver river" in the Chilcotin language
 Chilcotin River: "red ochre river people" in the Chilcotin language
 Chilkat Pass: "salmon storehouse" in the Tlingit language
 Chilko River: "red ochre river" in the Chilcotin language
 Chilliwack: "Going back up" in Halqemeylem. Other translations are "quieter water on the head" or "travel by way of a backwater of slough", all a reference to the broad marshlands and sloughs of the Chilliwack area, which lies between the Fraser River's many side-channels and Sumas Prairie (much of formerly Sumas Lake). Older spellings are Chilliwhack, Chilliwayhook, Chil-whey-uk, Chilwayook, and Silawack.
 Chinook Cove: on the North Thompson River, a reference to the Chinook salmon rather than to the language, wind or people of the same name.
 Choelquoit Lake: "fishtrap lake" in the Chilcotin language
 Chonat Bay: "where coho salmon are found" in Kwak'wala
 Chu Chua: the plural of the Secwepemc language word for "creek".
 Chuckwalla River: "short river" in Oowekyala. The nearby Kilbella River means "long river".
 Chukachida River
 Chutine River: "half-people" in either the Tlinkit or Tahltan languages. The area's population was half-Tlingit and half-Tahltan.
 Cinnemousun Narrows Provincial Park: From the Secwepemc language cium-moust-un, meaning "come and go back again", sometimes translated as "the bend" (i.e. in Shuswap Lake)
 Clayoquot Sound: an adaption of the Nuu-chah-nulth language Tla-o-qui-aht, which has a variety of translations: "other or different people", "other or strange house", "people who are different from what they used to be"; in Nitinaht the phrase translates as "people of the place where it becomes the same even when disturbed".
 Clo-oose: "campsite beach" in the Nitinaht dialect of Nuu-chah-nulth
 Clusko River: "mud river" in the Chilcotin language
 Cluxewe Mountain, Cluxewe River: "delta or sand bar" in Kwak'wala
 Coglistiko River: "stream coming from small jack-pine windfalls" in the Carrier language
 Colquitz River: "waterfall" in North Straits Salish
 Comiaken: "bare, devoid of vegetation" in Hulquminum
 Comaplix, British Columbia is a former mining town which was named after the Incomappleux River from the Lakes or Colville-Okanagan word nk'mapeleqs, meaning "point at end (of lake)".
 Comox: either from the Chinook Jargon for "dog" (kamuks), or from the Kwak'wala for "place of plenty".
 Conuma Peak: "high, rocky peak" in the Nuu-chah-nulth language
 Coqualeetza: "place of beating of blankets (to get them clean)" in Halqemeylem
 Coquihalla River, Coquihalla Mountain: "stingy container" (of fish) in Halqemeylem, a reference to black-coloured water spirits who would steal fish right off the spear
 Coquitlam: "small red salmon" in Halqemeylem (Upriver Halkomelem). Derived from the name of the Kwikwetlem people. Another and more usual translation is "stinking of fish slime" or "stinking fish", thought to be a reference to the Kwikwetlem people's role as slaves to the Katzie and Kwantlen as fish butchers.
 Cowichan: from Quwutsun, "land warmed by the sun" or "warm country" (Hulquminum)
 Cultus: "bad, of no value, worthless" in Chinook jargon. In First Nations legend, this popular recreational lake south of Chilliwack was said to be inhabited by evil spirits.
 Cumshewa, Cumshewa Inlet, Cunshewa Head: Cumshewa was a prominent Haida chief in the late 18th century, noted for the killing of the crew of the US trading vessel Constitution in 1794. His name means "rich at the mouth" (of the river)" and was conferred from the language of the Heiltsuk, who were allies of the Cumshewa Haida.

D–J
Dil-Dil Plateau, meaning unknown, probably Chilcotin language
Ealue Lake: "sky fish" in Tahltan.
Ecstall River: from the Tsimshian for "tributary" or "something from the side" (the Ecstall joins the Skeena River near Prince Rupert)
Eddontenajon: "child crying in the water" or "a little boy drowned" in Tahltan
Cape Edensaw: Edenshaw, in its modern spelling, remains an important name in modern Haida society, known mostly nowadays for the dynasty of famous carvers of that name, all descendants of the early 19th century chief of this name, one of the powerful chiefs of Masset
Edziza, Mount and Edziza, Mount volcanic complex: named after the Edzertza family of the Tahltan people, who live nearby.
Elaho River
Endako Lake, Carrier language
Esquimalt: North Straits Salish for "the place of gradually shoaling water". Derived from their word Es-whoy-malth.
Euchuk Lake, Carrier language
Fontas River: originally Fantasque's River, after the name of a chief of the Sekani people
Gataga River, Gataga Lakes, Gataga Mountain, Gataga River, Gataga Ranges, derived from the Sekani name for the river Tadadzè' (Guzagi K'úgé)
Gingolx, also sp. Kincolith, "Place of skulls" in the Nisga'a language
Gunn Valley, from the name of a member of the Xeni Gwet'in of Nemaiah Valley who lived there, ganin.
Hotnarko River
Hozameen Range
Hunlen Falls, from the name of a chief whose trapline was in the area of the falls
Incomappleux River is from the Lakes or Colville-Okanagan word nk'mapeleqs, meaning "point at end (of lake)". The name of the former town of Comaplix and adjacent mountain and creek are derived from the name of the river.
Inklin River
Kinuseo Falls, from the Cree for "fish"

K–L
Kalamalka Lake
Kamloops: anglicization of the Shuswap word Tk'emlups, meaning "where the rivers meet".
Kasalka Range, Kasalka Butte, Kasalka Creek
Kelowna: "ki?lawna?" meaning a male grizzly bear in the Okanagan language.
Kemano, from the name of one of the subdivisions of the Henaksiala people, a subgroup of the Haisla
Keremeos
Khutzeymateen River, Khutzeymateen Provincial Park, Khutzeymateen Inlet, from "K'tzim-a-deen" (Tsimshian language)
Kincolith – see Gingolx
Kitimat – people of the snow
Kitlope River, var. of Gitlope, the Tsimshian language name for the Gitlope, "people of the rocks", now amalgamated with the Gitamaat band as the Haisla First Nation.
Kitselas, British Columbia, Kitselas Canyon, "people of the village in the canyon" in the Tsimshian language
Kitsumkalum, British Columbia, Kitsumkalum River – "people of the riffles (in the shallow water" in the Tsimshian language.
Klemtu, from the Coast Tsimshian language "Klemdoo-oolk," meaning"impassable"
Kluskus Lakes, Kluskus Hills, Kluskus
Kootenay: derived from the proper name of the Kootenay people, Ktunaxa
Kuyakuz Mountain, Kuyakuz Lake
Kwadacha River "white water" in Sekani (indigenous spelling Kwàdàta or Kwodàch). The river contains high amounts of rock flour, so "white" is reference to the colour of the water, not to rapids.
Kwadacha Glacier
Kwadacha Mountain
Kwadacha Wilderness Provincial Park
Kwadacha, British Columbia (Fort Ware)
Lakelse Lake, Lakelse Lake Provincial Park, Lakelse Hot Springs etc. from the Coast Tsimshian "LaxGyels"
Kyuquot, British Columbia, Kyuquot Sound – from the name of the local group of Nuu-chah-nulth
Lillooet: adapted from the proper name for the Lower St'at'imc people, the Lil'wat of Mt. Currie. Lil'wat means "wild onions". The old name of Lillooet was Cayoosh Flat (1858–1860), derived from the name of one of the streams converging into the Fraser at the town (cayoosh is the local variant of Chinook Jargon for "horse" or "Indian pony").

M–N
Malahat
Malakwa: from Chinook Jargon malakwa for "mosquito(s)" (from fr. le maringouin).
Mamquam River
Marktosis
Masset – a Haida adaptation of a Spanish captain's name, possibly Masseta or Massetta
Matsqui: ″stretch of higher ground″
Mehatl Creek
Mesilinka River
Metchosin: English translation of Smets-Schosen, meaning "place of stinking fish"
Metsantan Pass, Metsantan Range – "People of the Caribou Hide" in Kaska. Also the name of the former settlement of Metsantan, aka Caribou Hide, and of Metsantan Creek and Metsantan Lake
Misinchinka River
Mount Tzouhalem, after the Quamichan chief and warrior who was banished there.
Mquqʷin/Brooks Peninsula Provincial Park.
Muskwa River, "bear" in the Cree language.
Naglico Lake, Naglico Hills
Nadina River, Nadina Mountain – the name of the river is derived from that of Nadina Mountain, which is near its source, the name of which means "standing up alone" in the Carrier language. The river's actual name in Carrier, not adopted by the geographical names board, is "Nadinako".
Nahatlatch River, Nahatlatch Needle
Nakina River
Nakusp – from the Sinixt or Okanagan language word "Neqo'sp" meaning "closed-in" or "safe"
Namu
Nanaimo: Named after the Snuneymuxw people.
Nanoose Bay
Natalkuz Lake
Nauwigewauk, New Brunswick: from the Wolastoqiyik (Maliseet) word "Nuhwig'ewauk", which is the Wolastoqey name for the Hammond River, possibly meaning "slow current."
Nazko – "river flowing from the south" in Carrier
Nemaiah Valley, from Nemiah, name of the founding chief who moved there from Hanceville
Nicolum River
Nicoamen River, Nicoamen Plateau
Nicolum River, Nicolum River Provincial Park
Nicomekl River – Halq'emeylem for "the route to go" or "the pathway".
Nicomen Island
Nimpkish River, from the name of the 'Namgis, the Kwakwaka'wakw people whose territory this river is in.
Nimpo Lake
Nitinat Lake: from the usual English spelling of the name of the Ditidaht people
Noaxe Lake, Noaxe Creek

O–Q
Okanagan:
Omineca River, Omineca Mountains, Omineca Country
Ominicetla River
Ootsa Lake
Opitsaht
Osilinka River
Osoyoos: From suius in the Okanagan language, meaning "Narrowing of the waters"; the O- prefix was added by English speakers to harmonize with Okanagan and other O-placenames in the area such as Omak, Oroville and Oliver.
Ospika River
Pasayten River
Penticton: "Place to stay forever" in Okanagan
Popkum: "puffball mushrooms" in Halqemeylem
Qualicum Beach, Qualicum River: "Where the dog salmon run" in Comox
Quanchus Range
Quatsino Sound, Quatsino Provincial Park, Quatsino, British Columbia, from Gwat'sinux, the name of the local group of Kwakwaka'wakw people.
Quispamsis, New Brunswick: From "qospemsis" in the Wolastoqiyik (Maliseet) word, meaning "Little lake in the woods", the lake being present-day Ritchie Lake.

S
Saanich: from WSANEC, the name of one of the local Straits Salish peoples and their language.
Sechelt: the town is named after the Shishalh people who live in the area
Shalalth: From Ts'alalh, "the lake" in the St'at'imcets language of the Lillooet people
Shulaps Range, Shulaps Peak: "ram of the mountain sheep" in the Chilcotin language.
Sicamous – "river circling mountains" in the Shuswap language.
Sikanni Chief River
Siska – from sisqa, Thompson language (Nlaka'pamux) for "uncle"
Skaha Lake: from the Okanagan language word for "dog" (sqexe). Skaha Lake in frontier times was often called Dog Lake, although that is the Shuswap language meaning of skaha; in the Okanagan language it means "horse" or "pony".
Skaist Mountain, Skaist River
Skeena River – from "X'san", Tsimshian (Gitksan) for "River of Mist"
Skihist Mountain and Skihist Provincial Park
Skidegate
Skookumchuck: "strong (skookum) ocean/water (chuck); that is: "strong tide, strong ocean current, rapids" in Chinook Jargon (three different locations – Sechelt Inlet, Lillooet River, Columbia River/East Kootenay, though also has a general meaning of a tidal rapids, usually at the mouth of an inlet).
Similkameen: From "Similkameugh" or "Samilkameigh" or "Samilkumeigh" meaning "white swan", one of the twelve tribes of the Okanagan people. The "-meen" ending was "forced by the whites" on this name to harmonize with the name of the river's tributary, the Tulameen.
Slocan and Slocan River: Slhu?kin Meaning "speared in the head" in the Lakes dialect of the Colville-Okanagan language and in reference to the traditional method of spear fishing in the region with a three pronged fish spear, a "lhumin."
Sloko River
Somass River
Sooke: named after the T'Souke people who live in the area
Spallumcheen
Spatsizi River and associated placenames
Spillimacheen River, Spillimacheen
Spuzzum, from the local variant of the Chinook Jargon spatsum, a reed used in basketry
Squamish and Squamish River: The river and the town are named after the Squamish people who live in the area
Stein River: Adjacent to Lytton BC, "Stein" is an adaptation of the Nlaka'pamux (Thompson) staygn – "hidden place".
Stellako River, Stellako
Stikine River and associated placenames. From Shta-KEEN, "great river" in the Tlingit language
Sumallo River
Sumas Lake, Sumas River, Sumas Mountain, and the old District of Sumas (now part of Abbotsford): from a Halqemeylem language word for ""a big level opening"

T
Taghum, British Columbia, taghum is the Chinook Jargon word for "six" (Taghum is six miles from Nelson)
Tagish Lake, Tagish Highland – "fish trap" or "it (spring ice) is breaking up" in the Tagish language
Tahltan, Tahltan River, Little Tahltan River, Tahltan Highland, a Tlingit language word for "something heavy in the water" (i.e. salmon), originally applied to the settlement, extended from there to become the name of the Tahltan people
Tahsis
Tahtsa Lake, Tahtsa Peak, Tahtsa Ranges
Talchako River, Talchako Pass
Takla Lake, Takla Landing
Taku River, Taku Plateau and the Taku Arm of Tagish Lake from the name of the Taku people
Talchako River
Tanzilla River, Tanzilla Plateau
Taseko Mountain, Taseko River, Taseko Lakes – from the Chilcotin language "Desiqox", which means "Mosquito River".
Tatla Lake
Tatlatui Provincial Park, Tatlatui Lake, Tatlatui Peak
Tatlayoko Lake
Tchaikazan River, from the Chilcotin language name for a peak visible from its valley, Ts^icheza'on.
Teslin Lake and Teslin, British Columbia, from the name of the local group of Inland Tlinkit
Tochquonyalla Range
Toodoggone River, originally "Thudegade" and from the Kaska language Tuhfa Ughane meaning "Two Brothers River or "eagles nest"
Tsʼilʔos Provincial Park, also Tsʼilʔos, Tsʼylos, Tsʼyl-os, Tsoloss, the Chilcotin language name for Mount Tatlow
Tulameen: Nlaka'pamux (Thompson) language for "red earth", a reference to the ochre found here.
Tuya River, Tuya Lake, Tuya Range, Little Tuya River
Tsawwassen: "Looking toward the sea" in North Straits Salish
Tyoax Pass, at the head of Tyaughton Creek (see next)
Tyaughton Lake, Tyaughton Creek (also Tyoax, Tyax), from the Chilcotin language for "jumping fish"
Tyhee Lake Provincial Park: Tyhee is a variant of the usual Chinook Jargon tyee – "chief, big, great, important, boss"

U–Z
Ucluelet: "people of the safe harbour" in the language of the Nuu-chah-nulth.
Unuk River
Wannock River, "poison" in Wuikyala
Wapiti River
Whonnock, Whonnock Lake, Whonnock Creek: from honnock, "humpback salmon" in Halqemeylem, the only variety of salmon to spawn in Whonnock Creek.
Yalakom River, Yalakom Mountain: "ewe of the mountain sheep" in the Chilcotin language
Yohetta Valley, Yohetta Creek, Yohetta Lake, from the Tsilhqot'in language yuyetabin [where bin means lake]
Yoho National Park – "Yoho" means "how amazing" or "it is beautiful"
Yuquot, the Nuu-chah-nulth language name, meaning "winds come from all directions", for the village usually known in English as Friendly Cove, on Nootka Sound
Zagoddetchino Mountain
Zus Mountain
Zymoetz River

Manitoba
Amiku: From the Ojibwe word "Amiik," meaning "beaver." From the population of beavers.
Grand Rapids: Translation of Cree word misepawistik, meaning "rushing rapids".
The Pas: From French Le Pas, a shortening of Fort Pascoyac, from the Pasquia River, named for the Opaskwayak Cree Nation.
Wapusk National Park: from wâpask, "polar bear" in Cree language
Winnipeg: "muddy water" from the word win-nipi of the Cree.

New Brunswick
 Apohaqui – translated from the Maliseet language, and means "The joining of two waters" or "the joining of two rivers". (Apohaqui is where the Millstream and the Kennebecasis River join.)
 Aroostook
 Bouctouche: a corruption of the Mi'kmaq word Chebooktoosk, meaning Great Little Harbour.
 Caraquet: Derived from the Mi'kmaq language, meaning "junction (or meeting) of two rivers".
 Escuminac
 Kennebecasis River
Kouchibouguac National Park (and River): Kouchibouguac means "river of the long tides" in Mi'kmaq.
 Magaguadavic Lake, a Mi'kmaq word meaning "lake of eels".
 Mactaquac, a Maliseet word meaning "big branch".
 Manawagonish Island
 Meductic : derived from the Maliseet word "Medoctic", meaning "the end".
 Meduxnekeag
 Miramichi : the name, which may be the oldest recorded name of aboriginal origin in Canada, may come from the Montagnais word for "country of the Micmac."
 Nackawic, which gets its name from the Maliseet word meaning "straight" or "not in the direction it seems to be", alluding to the illusion created at the intersection of the Nackawic Stream and the Saint John River.
 Nashwaak River : a corruption of the Maliseet word for slow current.
 Nashwaaksis
 Nauwigewauk :probably means babbling brook
 Oromocto : possibly from the Maliseet word welamooktook which means "good river"
 Penniac, meaning "fork in the river".
 Penobsquis is a blend of Micmac terms for stone and brook.
 Petitcodiac – term is derived from a Mi'kmaq word meaning "bends like a bow" (contradicts the popular belief that the name derived from the French term "petit coude", meaning "little elbow")
 Pokiok
 Quispamsis – translated from the Maliseet language and means, "little lake in the woods" (i.e., Ritchie Lake)
 Shiketehauk River
 Temisquata Lake
 Washademoak Lake
 Woolastook (alternately 'Wolastoq'):  Maliseet word meaning 'good and bountiful river': the Saint John River

Newfoundland and Labrador
Aguathuna: possibly derives from the Beothuk aguathoonet or aquathoont, "grindstone", imposed perhaps in the mistaken belief that it meant "white rock" for the limestone abundant in the area 
Kaipokok Bay: from Inuktitut, meaning "frothy water"
Ktaqmkuk: Land over the water from Mi'kmaq language "Newfoundland"
Makkovik: Vik is the Inuktitut word for "place". Makko- may have one of the following origins:
 it may be a corruption of the name Maarcoux, after Pierre Marcoux, a French trader in Labrador in the late 18th century ; or
 from the Inuktitut maggok, "two"; thus Makkovik would mean "two places". Around Makkovik are two inlets, Makkovik Bay and Makkovik harbour, and two main brooks floating into the two inlets. "Two Buchten Machovik", meaning "two bays Makkovik", is mentioned in a 1775 writing by the German Moravian missionary Johann Ludwig Beck.
Natuashish: from Innu-aimun, meaning "a small lake".
Nunatsiavut: from Inuktitut, meaning "our beautiful land"
Shannoc Brook: Joseph Beete Jukes, the Geological Surveyor of Newfoundland in 1839–1840, believed that Shannoc Brook, a tributary of the Exploits River, was given the Beothuk name for the Mi'kmaq.
Sheshatshiu: from Innu-aimun, meaning "a narrow place in the river".
Torngat Mountains: from the Inuktitut name for the region, turngait, meaning "spirits"; Inuit legends hold that here the spirit and physical worlds overlap.
Wabana – from the Abenaki wabunaki, "east land" from wabun "dawn"; so named in 1895 by Colonel Thomas Cantley, president of the Nova Scotia Steel Company
Wabush – from Innu-aimun uapush, "Arctic hare"

Nova Scotia
Antigonish: Derived from the Mi'kmaq word nalegitkoonechk, meaning "where branches are torn off".
Baddeck
Chebucto (the original name of Halifax and the Halifax Harbour): Derived from the Mi'kmaq word "Jipugtug", meaning "the biggest harbour".
Cobequid: Derived from the Mi'kmaq word "Wakobetgitk", meaning "end of the rushing or flowing water".
Ecum Secum: Derived from the Mi'kmaq language, meaning "a red house".
Eskasoni: Derived from the Mi'kmaq word We'kwistoqnik, meaning "Where the fir trees are plentiful".
Kejimkujik National Park: "Kejimkujik" has been translated as meaning "attempting to escape" or "swollen waters", but the park's official translation means "tired muscles".
Malagash
Merigomish
Mushaboom
Musquodoboit Harbour: foaming to the sea. The name is an anglicized version of the Mi’kmaq word Moosekudoboogwek.
Nictaux, Nova Scotia, meaning unknown
Pictou: Derived from the Mi'kmaq word "Piktook", meaning "an explosion of gas".
Pugwash: Derived from the Mi'kmaq word "pagwe’ak", meaning "deep water".
Shubenacadie:Derived from the Mi'kmaq word Shubenacadie (or Segubunakade) means "abounding in ground nuts" or "place where the red potato grows.
Stewiacke: Derived from the Mi'kmaq language, meaning "flowing out in small streams" and "whimpering or whining as it goes".
Tatamagouche: Derived from the Mi'kmaq word takumegooch, meaning "meeting of the waters".
Tracadie
Wagmatcook
Whycocomagh:Derived from a Mi'kmaq word which means "Head of the Waters".

Northwest Territories

Aulavik National Park, Aulavik means "place where people travel" in Inuvialuktun
Naats'ihch'oh National Park Reserve, Naats'ihch'oh means "stands like a porcupine" in the Dene Suline language
Nahanni National Park Reserve and South Nahanni River, from Nahani meaning "People over there far away" in the Dene language
Pingo Canadian Landmark, from Pingo an Inuvialuktun word for "small hill"
Slave River, thought to come from the Athabaskan Deh Gah Got'ine, the name for the Slavey group of the Dene First Nations
Thaydene Nene National Park, Thaydene Nene meaning "land of our ancestors" in the Dene language
Tuktut Nogait National Park, Tuktut Nurrait means "young caribous" in Inuvialuktun

Nunavut
Auyuittuq National Park – Auyuittuq means "the land that never melts".
Iqaluit: "many fish" in Inuktitut.
Pangnirtung is derived from Pangniqtuuq: "the place of many bull caribou"
Quttinirpaaq National Park – Qutsiniqpaaq/Quttiniqpaaq means "top of the world" in Inuktitut and Quttiniqpaaq in Inuinnaqtun.
Sirmilik National Park – Sirmilik means "the place of glaciers" in Inuktitut and Hirmilik in Inuinnaqtun.
Ukkusiksalik National Park – Ukkusiksalik means "place of have cooking pots" in Inuktitut and Utkuhikhalik in Inuinnaqtun/Natsilik/Kivalliq.

Ontario

Adjala-Tosorontio:Tosorontio is derived from the Huron (Wyandot) word meaning "beautiful mountain", and Adjala was the name of the wife of Chief Tecumseh.
Algonquin Provincial Park: Named after the Algonquin (Anishinaabeg) people of Ontario.
Almaguin Highlands: Derived from the words Algonquin and Magnetawan.
Assiginack
Algoma District
Atikokan: Ojibwe for "caribou bones."
Attawapiskat: "People of the parting of the rocks" from the Swampy Cree (Omushkegowuk) chat-a-wa-pis-shkag.
Brantford: Named after Joseph Brant, a Mohawk leader.
Cataraqui River
Cayuga: Named for the Cayuga people of Ontario.
Chinguacousy
Consecon: reportedly (see Squire’s Site archaeological dig, Consecon Lake) derived from either or some combination of ‘lake of many pickerel/fish’ (con ho con) or, according to Rev Bowen P. Squire, ‘water opening’ (Khan ho Kharon); however, according to an Anishinaabe elder, the name in Ojibwemowin means ‘waters overtaking’
Couchiching: Derived from the Ojibwe gojijiing, meaning "inlet."
Deseronto: Named for Captain John Deseronto, a native Mohawk leader who was a captain in the British Military Forces during the American Revolutionary War. 
Eramosa: Thought to be derived from the word un-ne-mo-sah (possibly meaning "black dog", "dead dog", or simply "dog").
Esquesing Township: Mississauga Anishinaabe word ishkwessin, meaning "that which lies at the end", which was the original name for Bronte Creek.
Etobicoke: "The place where the alders grow" from the word wadoopikaang in the Ojibwe language.
Fort Erie: Iroquoian, erige, meaning "cat".
Gananoque: Origin unknown, thought to be derived from Native languages for "place of health" or "meeting place" or "water running over rocks."
Garafraxa: Possibly derived from the word for "panther country".
Iroquois Falls: Named for the Iroquois people of Ontario.
Kakabeka Falls: From the Ojibwe word gakaabikaa, "waterfall over a cliff". 
Kaministiquia River: Derived from gaa-ministigweyaa, an Ojibwe word meaning "(river) with islands". 
Kanata: Mohawk word meaning "village" or "settlement."
Kapuskasing: Of Cree origin, possibly meaning "bend in river."
Kawartha Lakes: An Anglicization of the word ka-wa-tha (from ka-wa-tae-gum-maug or gaa-waategamaag), a word coined in 1895 by Martha Whetung of the Curve Lake First Nation, meaning "land of reflections" in the Anishinaabe language. The word was subsequently changed by tourism promoters to Kawartha, with the meaning "bright waters and happy lands."
Keewatin: Algonquian for "north wind." Derived from either kīwēhtin in Cree or giiwedin in Ojibwe.
Madawaska:  Named after an Algonquian band of the region known as Matouweskarini, meaning "people of the shallows".
Magnetawan: Derived from the word for "swiftly flowing river."
Manitoulin Island: "Manidoo Minis", Spirit Island. Manitoulin is the English version, via French, of the Old Odawa name Manidoowaaling, which means "cave of the spirit".
Manitouwadge: From manidoowaazh in Ojibwe, meaning "cave of the spirit."
Manitowaning: Manidoowaanhning, place of the spirit's den
Manotick: Derived from Algonquin for "island."
Matachewan
Matawatchan
Mattawa: "Meeting of the waters" in Ojibwe.
M'Chigeeng
Michipicoten: "Big bluffs" in Ojibwe.
Missinaibi Provincial Park: Cree for "pictured waters," thought to refer to the pictographs found on rock faces along the river.
Mississauga: Named for the native tribe of the Mississaugas
Mississippi Mills: May originate from Mazinaa[bikinigan]-ziibi, Algonquian for "[painted] image river", referring to the pictographs found on Mazinaw Lake.
Moosonee: Derived from the Cree word moosoneek, meaning "at the Moose (River)".
Muskoka: Named for a First Nations chief of the 1850s, Chief Yellowhead or Mesqua Ukie. 
Napanee
Nassagaweya: Derived from the Mississauga word nazhesahgewayyong, meaning "river with two outlets."
Neebing
Niagara: Iroquois in origin, meaning uncertain. 
Nipigon: May have originated from the Ojibwe word animbiigoong, meaning "at continuous water" or "at waters that extend [over the horizon]."
Nipissing: From the Anishinaabe term nibiishing, meaning "at (some) water".
Nottawasaga River: Derived from the Algonquin words for "Iroquois" and "river outlet".
Ohsweken
Oneida Nation of the Thames
Onondaga
Ontario
Opasatika, "river lined with poplars".
Opeongo, derived from the Algonquin word opeauwingauk meaning “sandy narrows”.
Oshawa: from the Ojibwe term aazhaway, meaning "crossing to the other side of a river or lake" or just "(a)cross".
Otonabee:  From the Ojibwe term "Odoonabii-ziibi" (Tullibee River). Otonabee comes from the words ode which means "heart" and odemgat that comes from "boiling water". It translates into "the river that beats like a heart in reference to the bubbling and boiling water of the rapids along the river"
Ottawa: "To buy" from the word adaawe in the Anishinaabe language; adapted as the name of the Odawa people.
Penetanguishene: believed to come from either the Wyandot language or from the Abenaki language via the Ojibwa language, meaning "land of the white rolling sands".
Petawawa: From Algonquin meaning "where one hears the noise of the water"
Powassan: From the word for "bend."
Pukaskwa National Park
Saugeen: Ojibwa language, Zaagiing, meaning outlet
Shawanaga
Scugog: Derived from the Mississauga word sigaog, which means "waves leap over a canoe."
Shuniah: named after the Ojibwa word "zhooniyaa" for "money" or "silver"
Sioux Narrows
Sioux Lookout
Tecumseh
Tehkummah
Temagami: from the Anishinaabe word dimiigami, "deep water(s)".
Timiskaming: from the Algonquin language Temikami or Temikaming, meaning "deep waters".
Toronto: from an Iroquoian language, but of uncertain derivation. Another story says it is derived from the Mohawk word "tkaronto" meaning "trees standing in the water".
Tuscarora
Tyendinaga: Derived from a variant spelling of Mohawk leader Joseph Brant's traditional Mohawk name, Thayendanegea.
Wahnapitae: from the Anishinaabe waanabide, "be shaped like a hollow tooth".
Waupoos: Ojibway for "rabbit"
Wasaga Beach: Derived from "Nottawasaga," as above.
Wawa
Wawanosh
Wikwemikong: from the Anishinaabe Wiikwemkoong, "Bay of Beavers" from Anishinaabe word "Amik" meaning beaver.
Wyoming: derived from the Munsee name xwé:wamənk, meaning "at the big river flat."

Quebec
Abitibi
Aguanish
Ahuntsic district of Montreal
Akpatok Island Akpaqtuq means "come down or lowers itself" in Inuktitut
Amqui
Arthabaska (and County)
Réservoir Cabonga
Réservoir Caniapiscau, and (River, Hunting camp, Regional county municipality)
Causapscal
Chibougamau or Chibouagmou:
Chicoutimi: "End of the deep water" in Innu or Cree.
Coaticook: Derived from the Abenaki language, meaning "river near the pines".
Donnacona: Named after Chief Donnacona, 16th century Iroquoian Chief of Stadacona.
Lac-Etchemin (and town)
Gaspé (also County, Peninsula, and Cape): "land's end" in Mi'kmaq.
Inukjuak Inugjuaq or Inujjuaq means "The Giant/Big Man" in Inuktitut
Kahnawake
Kamouraska County: Derived from the Abenaki language, meaning "birch bark here".
Kangiqsualujjuaq Kangiqsualujjuaq means "the very large bay" in Inuktitut
Kanesatake
Kawawachikamach, Naskapi Nation, Quebec
Lac Kénogami: Kenogami means "long water" in Montagnais.
Rivière Koksoak Quqsuaq means "Yellowish" in Inuktitut
Kuujjuaq Kuujjuaq means "the great river" in Inuktitut
Lac Manitou: Derived from the Algonquian name Gitchi Manitou, which in their culture describes their Creator (the Great Spirit).
Maniwaki
Maskinongé (and County)
Matane
Matane County
Matapédia County
Réservoir and Rivière Matawin
Magog: Derived from "Memphremagog", see Lake Memphremagog below.
Manicouagan River: "where there is bark"
Mascouche
Mégantic County (also Lake): Abenaki for "lake trout place".
Lac Memphremagog: Meaning "beautiful waters" or "vast expanse of water" in Abenaki.
Missisquoi County: Missisquoi is an Abenaki tribal name.
Nastapoka Islands
Oka
Pohenegamook
Pontiac County: Name of the famous 18th-century Ottawa leader Pontiac.
Quebec City (and County, and Province): The "narrowing of the river" refers to the point where the St. Lawrence River passes Quebec City.
Rimouski (and County)
Saguenay
Salluit Salluit means "the thin ones" in Inuktitut
Sayabec
Shawinigan: "Portage at the crest" in Algonquian.
Squatec
Tadoussac
Temiscamingue County
Témiscouata County: Abenaki for "bottomless" or "extremely deep all around".
Torngat Mountains Tuurngat means "Spirits or sometimes Evils" in Inuktitut
Yamachiche
Yamaska County

Saskatchewan
Assiniboia: Derived from the name of the Assiniboine First Nation people.
Cypress Hills: Early Métis hunters, who spoke a variation of French, called the hills les montagnes des Cyprès, in reference to the abundance of jack pine trees. In the Canadian French spoken by the Métis, the jack pine is called cyprès. 
Kamsack: From a First Nation word meaning something vast and large.
Katepwa: Likely derived from the Cree word Kahtapwao meaning What is calling?.
Kenosee lake
Kinistino: It has been suggested that the word Kinistino is equivalent to running water in Cree. This has not been able to be verified.
Lake Athabasca: From Woods Cree: aðapaskāw, [where] there are plants one after another.
Manitou Beach: When the world was created, the Great Spirit, Aasha Monetoo, gave the land to the indigenous peoples.
Ministikwan Lake Cree Nation
Mistusinne: Derived from the Plains Cree word mistasiniy meaning big stone which resembled a sleeping bison.
Moosomin From the Cree word for the mooseberry or high bush cranberry.
Nipawin: Derived from the Cree word meaning a bed, or resting place which referred to a low-lying area along the river now flooded by Codette Lake.
Nokomis: Named for Hiawatha's grandmother in Longfellow's epic poem, chosen in 1906 by postmistress Florence Mary Halstead.
Ogema: "Omega" is Greek for "end", being "the end of the rail-line". Two communities had the same name, so two letters were switched to become "Ogema". Ogema is an Anishinaabemowin word meaning Chief.
Piapot: Named for Chief Piapot, meaning Hole in the Sioux or One Who Knows the Secrets of the Sioux.
Saskatoon: Derived from the Cree word misāskwatōmin, meaning Saskatoon berry – a fruit native to the area.
Sintaluta: The name comes from a Lakota word meaning tail of the red fox.
Wadena: Named after Wadena, Minnesota, the origin of some early settlers of American descent, which was named after Chief Wadena, an Ojibwe Chief.
Wakaw: A Cree word meaning crooked, referring to nearby Wakaw Lake.
Wapella: Meaning either water underground or gently falling snow, where wape means to snow in Dakota. 
Waskesiu: From the Cree word meaning red deer or elk. (Also resort town of Waskesiu Lake)
Wawota: From the Dakota words wa ota, which means much snow. Wa means snow, oda or ota means lots.

Yukon
Aishihik Lake and Aishihik River: meaning "tail hanging down" in Southern Tutchone
Alsek River 
Dezadeash Lake
Ivvavik National Park: Ivavik means "birthplace" or "nursery" in Inuvialuktun
Klondike and Klondike River: Derived from the Hän language word for hammer stones used to fix salmon nets (Tr'ondëk).
Kluane Lake and Kluane National Park and Reserve: from Łù'àn meaning big fish in Southern Tutchone
Klukshu and Klukshu River 
Kusawa Lake 
Nisutlin River 
Tagish Lake and Tagish, Yukon: from the name of the language and people (Tagish Kwan)
Takhini River 
Tatshenshini River 
Teslin Lake, Teslin River and Teslin, Yukon: from the Tlingit Deisleen, long narrow water
Vuntut National Park

See also

 Indigenous mapping
 List of English words from indigenous languages of the Americas
 List of placenames of indigenous origin in the Americas
 List of place names in New England of aboriginal origin
 List of Indian reserves in Canada
 List of Indian reserves in Canada by population
 List of First Nations band governments
 List of First Nations peoples
 Classification of indigenous peoples of the Americas
 List of Chinook Jargon place names

Notes

References

Further reading
 
 Bright, William (2004). Native American Placenames of the United States. Norman: University of Oklahoma Press.
 Central Quebec School Board
 Indian and Northern Affairs Canada
 Geographical Names of Canada

Resources
 The composition of Indian geographical names, illustrated from the Algonkin languages, Trumbull, J. Hammond (James Hammond), 1821–1897. [Hartford, Conn.? : s.n., 187–?]
 http://www.arcticplacenames.ca

place names
Place names
Canada
Indigenous origin
Indigenous
Canada
Names of places in Canada